is a railway station located in the city of  Gifu, Gifu Prefecture,  Japan, operated by the private railway operator Meitetsu.

Lines

Station layout
Yanaizu Station has one ground-level side platform serving a single bi-directional track on a sharp curve. The station is unattended.

Platforms

Adjacent stations

History
It was named Yanaizu Station on February 1, 1953.

Surrounding area
formerYanaizu Town Hall
Hashima Kita High School

See also
 List of Railway Stations in Japan

External links

  

Railway stations in Japan opened in 1921
Stations of Nagoya Railroad
Railway stations in Gifu Prefecture